Devipur may refer to: 
  
Devipur, Deoghar, a community development block in Deoghar district, Jharkhand, India
Devipur, Deoghar (village), a village in Jharkhand, India
Devipur, Siraha, a village development committee in Siraha District, Sagarmatha Zone, Nepal

See also
 Devipuram, a Hindu temple complex near Visakhapatnam, Andhra Pradesh, India
 Debipur (disambiguation)
 Devapur, Yadgir, Karnataka, India